Robert Jacques Lanois (April 4, 1948 – April 19, 2021) was a Canadian sound engineer, record producer, and harmonica player.  He released his first album, Snake Road, in 2006, in collaboration with his brother Daniel Lanois. He also recorded an album with guitarist Tom Wilson, entitled The Shack Recordings Volume One.

Among other credits, he co-produced Simply Saucer's demo tape with Daniel. He was also given a credit in the "Thanks to" section of U2's The Joshua Tree album credits.

Bob Lanois travelled to Sweden in 2007, performing shows together with eclectic Swedish band Big Is Less after having met the band's guitarist Tommy Sahlin via MySpace. In 2008, Lanois, as producer, teamed up with Mass Conception (a Canadian indie band) which resulted in the release of a six-song EP entitled No Pun Intended.

He died on April 19, 2021.

Discography

Sound engineer
1977  Adult Entertainment, Raffi
1979 Denis LePage & Station Road, Denis Lepage
1977 Hobo's Taunt - Willie P. Bennett (engineered, with Daniel Lanois)
1979 Blackie and the Rodeo King - Willie P. Bennett (recording engineer; mixing engineer, with David Essig)

As musician
1971 Jacqueline & Lindsay
2006 Snake Road (Cordova Bay)

As photographer 
 2015 Oxide (Ion Bon)

References

External links

 
 

1940s births
2021 deaths
Musicians from Gatineau
Musicians from Hamilton, Ontario
Canadian record producers
Canadian harmonica players
Canadian ambient musicians
Canadian audio engineers